Bernard Francis Witucki  (February 25, 1911 – April 8, 2000) was an American football player and coach. From 1935 to 1943, he was the head football coach at Washington High School in South Bend, Indiana, compiling a 60–10–6 record. He was also the head football coach for the Tulsa Golden Hurricane football team during the 1953 and 1954 seasons. He was fired after the 1954 team compiled a winless 0–11 record. He died in 2000 at age 89 at his home in South Bend, Indiana.

Head coaching record

College

References

1911 births
2000 deaths
Notre Dame Fighting Irish football coaches
Tulsa Golden Hurricane football coaches
High school football coaches in Indiana
Sportspeople from South Bend, Indiana